Akissforjersey is an American post-hardcore band from Pilot Mountain, North Carolina formed in July 2004. The current lineup consists of vocalist Zach Dawson, drummer Joey Allen, guitarists Tyler Lucas and Bob Gassett, and bassist Parker Williams. The band released their debut studio album, Keep Your Head Above the Water, in 2006 through Tragic Hero Records. Their sophomore album Victims was released through Tragic Hero Records again in 2008. They signed to inVogue Records in 2014 and  released their third album New Bodies on January 21, 2014. New Bodies was considered a breakthrough release upon the Billboard magazine charts, where it placed on the Heatseekers Albums.

History
Akissforjersey formed in July 2004 in Pilot Mountain, North Carolina. Their members currently are vocalist, Zach Dawson, drummer, Joey Allen, former bassist and current guitarist Tyler Lucas, another guitarist, Bob Gassett, and current bassist, Parker Williams, with their former members, guitarists Matthew Bean and Cory Wood, who both left between 2008 and 2014. In early 2009, the band broke up, but on December 24, 2009, they reformed.

They released their debut album, Keep Your Head Above the Water,  through Tragic Hero Records on August 22, 2006. Their second album, Victims, was released on May 6, 2008 by Tragic Hero Records. They subsequently signed to inVogue Records, where they released a third album, New Bodies, on January 21, 2014. The album was their breakthrough release upon the Billboard magazine charts, where it placed on the Heatseekers Albums, at a peak position of 26.

Touring
The band has played at the debut Scream the Prayer Tour, along with well-known acts, Impending Doom, Sleeping Giant, Soul Embraced, Haste the Day, Before Their Eyes, and War of Ages. In August 2008, the band went on a US tour alongside War of Ages and Oh, Sleeper.

Members

Current members 

 Zach Dawson – vocals (2004-2009, 2009–present) 
 Joey Allen – drums (2007-2009, 2009–present) 
 Tyler Lucas – guitar (2009–present), bass, vocals (2004-2009)
 Cory Wood – rhythm guitar, backup vocals (2004-2009, 2022-present)

Past members 

 Matthew Bean – lead guitar (2004-2009)
 John Carpenter - drums (2004-2006)
 Parker Williams – bass (2009–2022)
 Bob Gassett – guitar (2009–2022)

Discography

Studio albums

Music videos 

 "Oh, Infamous City" (2008, Victims)
 "War" (2014, New Bodies)

References

External links
 Facebook page* . HM Magazine. 2008. Retrieved on May 8, 2016.

2004 establishments in North Carolina
Musical groups from North Carolina
Musical groups established in 2004
People from Surry County, North Carolina
Tragic Hero Records artists